Fremont County School District #1 is a public school district based in Lander, Wyoming, United States.

Geography
Fremont County School District #1 serves the southern portion of Fremont County, including the following communities:

Incorporated places
Town of Hudson
City of Lander
Census-designated places (Note: All census-designated places are unincorporated.)
Atlantic City
Jeffrey City
Unincorporated places
South Pass City

Schools

The District currently has six schools, five within the town of Lander and one at the community of Jeffrey City.

High schools
Grades 9-12
Lander Valley High School
Pathfinder High School (Alternative)

Middle school
Grades 6-8
Lander Middle School

Elementary schools
Grades K-6
Jeffrey City Elementary School
Gannett Peak Elementary School  (South Elementary prior to summer 2011, also students from North Elementary School merged into Gannett Peak Elementary)
Baldwin Creek Elementary School (West Elementary prior to summer 2011)

Student demographics
The following figures are as of October 1, 2009.

Total District Enrollment: 1,672
Student enrollment by gender
Male: 849 (50.78%)
Female: 823 (49.22%)
Student enrollment by ethnicity
American Indian or Alaska Native: 235 (14.06%)
Asian: 17 (1.02%)
Black or African American: 6 (0.36%)
Hispanic or Latino: 113 (6.76%)
Native Hawaiian or Other Pacific Islander: 2 (0.12%)
Two or More Races: 98 (5.86%)
White: 1,201 (71.83%)

See also

List of school districts in Wyoming

References

External links
 

Education in Fremont County, Wyoming
School districts in Wyoming
Lander, Wyoming